Bhiwandi Road is a railway station in Mumbai, India, on the Vasai Road–Diva–Panvel route of the Central Railway, of the Mumbai Suburban Railway network. The Bhiwandi station lies on the Vasai–Diva corridor, between the Western Line and Central line. Computerised reservation services has been installed at this station obviating the need to go to Kalyan to for tickets.

The platforms at Bhiwandi railway station are very spacious. There are 5 platforms. The trains towards  & Diva halt at platform 1, 2 or 3 and the train moving towards Vasai halt at platform 4 or 5.Last few months 2 or new track construction work at this side .

There was a necessity for a suburban rail line for Bhiwandi. The Mumbai Metropolitan Region Development Authority started to construct the Thane–Kalyan Line 5 through Bhiwandi.

History 
In British times, sweet sugarcane was spread from saltbunder road to Bhiwandi. In this area railway was stopped by the British for transporting salt by freight.

Train statistics
 Number of halting trains          :51
 Number of originating trains     :0
 Number of terminating trains   :0

Major trains

 61002-Dombivli-Boisar MEMU
 69164-Dahanu Road–Pavel MEMU
 69165-Panvel–Vasai Road MEMU
 61003-Vasai Road–Diva MEMU
 61004-Diva–Vasai Road MEMU
 61005-Vasai Road–Diva MEMU
 61006-Diva–Vasai Road MEMU
 61007-Vasai Road–Diva MEMU
 61008-Diva–Vasai Road MEMU
 61009-Vasai Road–Diva MEMU
 61021-Vasai Diva MEMU   Not on Sunday & Saturday
 61022-Diva–Vasai MEMU   Not on Sunday & Saturday
 69166-Vasai Road–Panvel MEMU
 69167-Panvel–Vasai Road MEMU
 69168-Vasai–Panvel MEMU
 69161-Panvel–Dahanu Road MEMU
 19201–Secunderabad Porbandar Weekly Express
 19202–Secunderabad Express
 17017–Secunderabad Express
 17018-Rajkot Express
 16613-Coimbatore Express
 19311-Pune–Indore Express
 19312-Indore–Pune Express
 22943-Pune–Indore SF Express
 22944-Indore–Pune SF Express
 16506-Gandhidham Express
 16507-KSR Bengaluru Express
 165335-Nagercoil Weekly Express
 16336-Gandhidham Express
 16333-Thiruvananthapuram Express
 16337-Okha–Ernakulam- Express
 16338-Ernakulam–Okha Express
 11049-SCSMT Kolhapur Express
 11050-Ahmedabad Express
 16505-KSR Bengaluru Express
 16507-KSR Bengaluru Express
 16508-Jodhpur Express
 16531-KSR Bengaluru Express
 16532-Ajmer Garib Nawaz Express
 11087-Veraval–Pune Express
 11088-Pune–Veraval Express
 11089-Pune Express
 11090-Bhagat Ki Kothi Express
 11092-Pune–Bhuj Express
 11095-Pune Ahimsa Express
 11096-Ahmedabad Ahimsa Express
 16209-Ajmer–Myusuru Express
 16210-Mysuru–Ajmer Express

Facilities 
The platforms are well sheltered. The station is well connected by auto. It provides parking facilities. Smart card-based booking is also installed in the station.

References

Mumbai Suburban Railway stations
Mumbai CR railway division
Railway stations in Thane district